The following is a list of notable events and releases of the year 1920 in Norwegian music.

Events

Deaths

Births

 January
 11 – Ole Henrik Moe, pianist, art historian, and critic (died 2013).

 February
 15 – Rolf Andersen, trumpeter, orchestra conductor, and bandleader (died 2016).
 16 — Karsten Andersen, orchestra conductor (died 1997).

 August
 3 – Jonas Brunvoll, Jr., operatic singer and actor (died 1982).
 28 – Rowland Greenberg, trumpeter, vocalist, and bandleader (died 1994).

See also
 1920 in Norway
 Music of Norway

References

 
Norwegian music
Norwegian
Music
1920s in Norwegian music